Van Nest Wildlife Refuge is a  wildlife management area in Hamilton Township, Mercer County, New Jersey, United States.

References

Protected areas of Mercer County, New Jersey
Hamilton Township, Mercer County, New Jersey
Wildlife management areas of New Jersey